Thomas or Tom Sharp may refer to:

 Thomas Sharp (priest) (1693–1758), English churchman (Archdeacon of Northumberland), biographer and theological writer
 Thomas C. Sharp, opponent of Joseph Smith, Jr. and the Latter Day Saints
 Thomas Sharp (town planner) (1901 - 1978), English town planner and author
 Tom Sharp (footballer) (born 1957), Scottish football defender
 Tom Sharp (trader) (1838–1929), Confederate soldier and explorer, operated a trading post on the Taos Trail
 Tom Sharp (cricketer) (born 1977), English cricketer

See also
Thomas Sharpe (disambiguation)